Zirconic is the name of a program for the development of stealth reconnaissance satellites for the National Reconnaissance Office (NRO). The program includes the Misty and Prowler spacecraft.

External links 
 Stealth Satellite Sourcebook
 Globalsecurity.org article
 "New Spy Satellite Debated on Hill", The Washington Post, 11 December 2004

National Reconnaissance Office satellites